Samuel Petráš (born 10 April 1999) is a Slovak professional footballer who plays for Fortuna Liga club DAC Dunajská Streda, on loan from MŠK Žilina.

Club career

MŠK Žilina
Petráš made his Fortuna Liga debut for Žilina on 14 June 2020 during a home match against Spartak Trnava, in which Šošoni recorded a 2:1 win. Petráš conceded the single goal from Bamidele Yusuf.

International career
Petráš was first recognised as an alternate broader squad member by Štefan Tarkovič for the senior Slovak national team on 28 September ahead of two 2022 FIFA World Cup qualifiers against Russia and Croatia. In December 2022, Petráš was nominated by Francesco Calzona, who joined the side in late summer, for Slovak national team prospective players' training camp at NTC Senec.

References

External links
 MŠK Žilina official club profile
 
 
 Futbalnet profile

1999 births
Living people
Sportspeople from Žilina
Slovak footballers
Slovakia youth international footballers
Slovakia under-21 international footballers
Association football goalkeepers
MŠK Žilina players
FC DAC 1904 Dunajská Streda players
2. Liga (Slovakia) players
Slovak Super Liga players